Each year, the Iowa Mr. Basketball award is given to the male athlete chosen as the best high school boys basketball player in the U.S. state of Iowa in the United States.

Awarded since 1981, winners were chosen by the Iowa Newspaper Association at the time that annual all-state selections are made until 2017. Starting with the 2018 season, the honor was awarded by the newly formed Iowa Print Sports Writers Association, who took over all-state selections for the newspaper industry starting with the 2018 high school basketball seasons. Most of the award winners have gone on to play at the highest levels of college basketball, and some have continued play in the National Basketball Association.

Voting is done on a points system.  Each voter selects first, second, and third-place votes.  A player receives five points for each first-place vote, three points for each second-place vote, and one point for a third-place vote.  The player receiving the most points receives the award.

Award winners

References

External links
 http://www.globegazette.com/articles/2009/03/17/sports/preps/doc49bf271e75641335363929.txt

Mr. and Miss Basketball awards
Awards established in 1981
Mr. Basketball
Mr. Basketball